In broadcasting, a phone-in or call-in is a programme format in which viewers or listeners are invited to air their live comments by telephone, usually in respect of a specific topic selected for discussion on the day of the broadcast. On radio (especially talk radio), it is common for an entire programme to be dedicated to a phone-in session. On television, phone-in's are often part of a wider discussion programme: a current example in the UK is the "Jeremy Vine" TV show.

The concept dates to the early radio era: a December 1924 BBC 5NG Nottingham phone-in programme is described in a 1925 Radio Times article: "listeners ... enjoyed the novelty of hearing their own voices taking part". A prior attempted phone-in to a BBC 2LO London programme "led to such a rush on the telephones that the Post Office had to intervene".

Speech based Talk Radio UK was launched in 1995, with much of its programming featuring phone-ins. It also introduced the notion of the shock jock to the UK, with presenters like Caesar the Geezer and Tommy Boyd constructing heated discussions.

Ian Hutchby has researched power relations in phone ins, looking at arguments and confrontations.  Using conversation analysis, he describes how the host retains power through devices such as "The Second Position" – the concept of going second in a discussion, giving the host time to formulate a response.

Similarly, the last word is always the broadcast word. The public can choose to end the conversation, but they are doing so by withdrawing from the interactional arena (Hutchby, 1996: 94-5; Talbot et al.).

In 2007, the BBC suspended all phone-in competitions (but not voting) due to an internal inquiry into corruption in the production of these games in shows such as charity telethons after a nationwide inquiry into the whole process leading to the cancellation of ITV Play.

In Ireland Liveline is a popular afternoon phone in show broadcast by RTÉ Radio 1 that is hosted by Joe Duffy. The phone in program usually focuses on consumer issues, current affairs and complaints from members of the public regarding various issues. The program and its presenter are frequently lampooned by numerous Irish comedians, one being David McSavage, who play on the popular perception that the program is merely an outlet for the angst of serial complainers and housewives while providing entertainment for those who revel in listening to despair and tales of misery delivered the callers. A quality of the show that is frequently satirized is Duffy's seemingly exasperated expressions of despair upon hearing of the plight of a caller.

Technology
The caller is connected via a telephone hybrid, which connects the telephone line to the audio console through impedance matching, or more modernly through digital signal processing, which can improve the perceived audio quality of the call.  Telephone calls are often organised through a system which also provides broadcast automation, with an administrative assistant answering calls and entering caller information on a personal computer, which also displays on the radio presenter's screen.  A profanity delay is often used to keep profanity and other inappropriate material off the air.  For contests, the conversation can be recorded and edited "on the fly", before playback on the air just a few minutes later.

See also
 Vox populi
 Tradio

References

Bibliography

Mass media